The Baltimore Lord Baltimores were a professional pre-Negro league baseball team based in Baltimore, Maryland in 1887. The Lord Baltimores played as charter members of the short–lived 1887 National Colored Base Ball League, hosting home games at Oriole Park.

History
The 1887 National Colored Base Ball League was an early organization of a professional Negro league, with Baltimore fielding a franchise. The league began play with six teams: the Baltimore Lord Baltimores, Boston Resolutes, Louisville Fall City, New York Gorhams, Philadelphia Pythians and Pittsburgh Keystones as the charter members. The Washington Capital Citys and the Cincinnati Browns both joined the National Colored Base Ball League on March 15, 1887, although neither team would play a game. In late May of 1887 the National Colored Base Ball League folded permanently.

The team was managed by Joseph Callis and Hugh Cummings. Baltimore won their opening game on May 5, 1887; a 15–12 victory over the Philadelphia Pythians. The Lord Baltimores were quickly affected by financial struggles that impacted league member teams. After a game in Louisville, the Boston Resolutes franchise discovered it did not have the finances to pay for the team to travel to their next game in Pittsburgh and its players were stranded in Louisville. The Resolutes remained stranded in Louisville for their next scheduled two-game series against the Lord Baltimores. Boston forfeited both games, although the first forfeit was declined by Baltimore.

By the time the league collapsed the Pythians were in first with a 4–3 record and the Lord Baltimores were in second at 5–5. Baltimore was led by William Gray, who was hitting .417 and Joseph Stewart who had a 2–1 won-loss record as a pitcher.

The ballpark
The Lord Baltimores secured the use of Oriole Park on 25th Street as their home ballpark. This was possible due to the Orioles beginning their 1887 season on the road.

Notable players

Mainly playing outfield, James W. Wilson of the Lord Baltimores was the first native African to play professional baseball. In the league games for which box scores exist, Wilson batted .296/.321/.444. Originally from Cape Mount, Liberia,  Wilson travelled to the United States and studied Theology at Lincoln University. Wilson’s professional career pre-dates that of Gift Ngoepe (South Africa) by more than a century, and Alfredo Cabrera (Canary Islands) by two decades.

Timeline

Schedule

See also
 List of minor Negro league baseball teams

References

External links
 Baseball Reference

Negro league baseball teams
Baseball teams established in 1887
Baseball teams disestablished in 1887
Defunct baseball teams in Maryland
Sports teams in Baltimore
Professional baseball teams in Maryland
African-American history of Maryland